Ta-Bitjet is an ancient goddess of Egyptian mythology.  She is identified as the consort of Haroeris.  Ta-Bitjet is a scorpion goddess and the blood that flowed from when Horus/Haroeris ruptured her hymen can serve as a panacea for poisons. She could be associated with another bride of one of the Horuses, Serket.

References

External links
 

Health goddesses
Egyptian goddesses
Mythological arthropods
Animal goddesses